Boiga drapiezii, commonly known as Drapiez's cat snake and the white-spotted cat snake, is a species of long and slender rear-fanged snake in the family Colubridae. The species is native to Maritime Southeast Asia and is common throughout its range.

Etymology
The epithet, drapiezii, is in honor of Belgian naturalist Auguste Drapiez.

Description
There are two known phases of B. drapiezii. The green phase has a marbled green body with a more robust head and width. The brown phase is much more slender with orange brown triangle-like bands across the body. This species is in need of urgent review, with possibly subspecies awaiting discovery and subsequent description.

Geographic range
B. drapiezii is found in Borneo, Indonesia, Peninsular Malaysia, the Philippines, Singapore, and Thailand, Vietnam.

Habitat

Behavior
The white-spotted cat snake is nocturnal and arboreal. It can often be found moving about on the forest floor in search of prey and travel. It is found in tropical rainforest, sometimes on branches near streams.

Diet
In the wild, the white-spotted cat snake preys upon frogs, geckos, and other small lizards, as well as insects, birds, and bird eggs.

Reproduction
B. drapiezii is oviparous.

References

Further reading
Boie F (1827). "Bemerkungen über Merrem's Versuch eines Systems der Amphibien, 1. Lieferung: Ophidier ". Isis von Oken, Jena 20: 508–566. (Dipsas drapiezii H. Boie, new species, p. 549). (in German and Latin).
Boulenger GA (1896). Catalogue of the Snakes in the British Museum (Natural History). Volume III., Containing the Colubridæ (Opisthoglyphæ and Proteroglyphæ) ... London: Trustees of the British Museum (Natural History). (Taylor and Francis, printers). xiv + 727 pp. + Plates I-XXV. (Dipsadomorphus drapiezii, pp. 74–75).
Das I (2006). A Photographic Guide to Snakes and other Reptiles of Borneo. Sanibel Island, Florida: Ralph Curtis Books. 144 pp. . (Boiga drapiezii, p. 23).

External links
 Gernot Vogel's Boiga species checklist

drapiezii
Snakes of Southeast Asia
Reptiles of Thailand
Reptiles described in 1827
Reptiles of Indonesia
Reptiles of Borneo